A series of events which occurred in Italy in 1380:
 Battle of Chioggia
The naval Battle of Chioggia took place in June 1380 in the lagoon off Chioggia, Italy, between the Venetian and the Genoese fleets, who had captured the little fishing port in August the preceding year. This occurred during the War of Chioggia.

Births
Giovanni Berardi

Deaths
Matteo di Cione

External links
 The War of Chioggia
 Wayback Machine

Italy
Italy
Years of the 14th century in Italy